The College Mathematics Journal is an expository magazine aimed at teachers of college mathematics, particular those teaching the first two years. It is published by Taylor & Francis on behalf of the Mathematical Association of America and is a continuation of Two-Year College Mathematics Journal. It covers all aspects of mathematics. It publishes articles intended to enhance undergraduate instruction and classroom learning, including expository articles, short notes, problems, and "mathematical ephemera" such as fallacious proofs, quotations, cartoons, poetry, and humor.
Paid circulation in 2008 was 9,000 and total circulation was 9,500.

The MAA gives the George Pólya Awards annually "for articles of expository excellence" published in the College Mathematics Journal.

References

External links

The College Mathematics Journal at JSTOR
The College Mathematics Journal at Taylor & Francis Online

Mathematics journals
Publications established in 1970
1970 establishments in the United States